Baekajeolhyeon is the fifth album by South Korean hip-hop duo Leessang. The album was released on January 8, 2009. The album contains 12 songs.

Track listing

References

2009 albums
Korean-language albums
Leessang albums